This page is a list of tunnels in North Korea.

Rail

Mass transit
Chollima Line
Hyoksin Line

Korean State Railway
Saenggiryong Railway Tunnel

Road

Pyongyang–Wonsan Tourist Motorway
Tunnels from Pyongyang to Wonsan in order:

Pyongyang-Kaesong Motorway

Tunnels from Pyongyang to Kaesong, in order:

Pyongyang–Huichon Motorway 
There are two tunnels near Kaechon.
The eastern tunnel is the 2nd Sŏhwa tunnel (서화2굴), whose length is 417m.
The western tunnel is therefore perhaps the 1st Sŏhwa tunnel (서화1굴).

Pyongyang–Kangdong Motorway 
There is a tunnel and depressed section of the road in Songmun.
An unused tunnel under the Taedong river, being bypassed by the Taedong River Bridge.

Pyongyang

There are three Geumneung tunnels, one on the Chongryu Bridge, one on the Rungra Bridge, and one by the Kumsusan Palace of the Sun.
금릉동굴/금릉1호동굴 Rungra Bridge Geumneung tunnel with eastern and western portals.
금릉동굴/금릉2호동굴 Chongryu Bridge Geumneung tunnel
금릉동굴 Kumsusan Palace Geumneung tunnel
마람굴 Maram tunnel (road to Pyongsong)

Incursion tunnels to South Korea

See also
List of tunnels by location
List of bridges in North Korea

References

Tunnels in North Korea
Lists of buildings and structures in North Korea
Lists of tunnels